Dorrit Willumsen (born 31 August 1940 in Nørrebro, Copenhagen) is a Danish writer. She made her literary debut in 1965 with the short story collection Knagen.

She was awarded the Danish Critics Prize for Literature in 1983. In 1995 she was awarded the Søren Gyldendal Prize. In 1997 she was awarded the Nordic Council's Literature Prize for the novel Bang. En roman om Herman Bang. She married the playwright Jess Ørnsbo in 1963, and their son Tore Ørnsbo (1970-) is also a writer.

Works 
 1965 Knagen, short stories
 1967 Stranden, novel
 1968 Da, novel
 1970 The, krydderi, acryl, salær, græshopper, novel
 1973 Modellen Coppelia, short stories
 1974 En værtindes smil
 1976 Kontakter, poetry
 1976 Neonhaven, novel
 1978 Hvis det virkelig var en film, short stories
 translated as If it Really Were a Film (1982)
 1978 Den usynlige skønhed, poetry
 1980 Danske fortællinger, short stories
 1980 Manden som påskud
 1982 Programmeret til kærlighed
 1983 Umage par, poetry
 1984 Marie: en novel om Marie Tussauds liv
 translated by Patricia Crampton as Marie: a novel about the life of Madame Tussaud (1986)
 1985 Caroline, play
 1988 Suk hjerte, novel
 1989 Glemslens forår, short stories
 1995 Klædt i purpur, historical novel
 1997 Bang. En roman om Herman Bang
 1997 De kattens feriedage, humour
 2000 Koras stemme, novel
 2001 Tøs: et hundeliv
 2003 Bruden fra Gent, novel
 2005 Den dag jeg blev Honey

References

1940 births
Living people
Danish women short story writers
Nordic Council Literature Prize winners
Danish women novelists
Recipients of the Grand Prize of the Danish Academy
Writers from Copenhagen
20th-century Danish women writers
20th-century Danish novelists
20th-century Danish poets
21st-century Danish poets
21st-century Danish women writers
21st-century Danish novelists
Danish women poets
20th-century Danish short story writers
21st-century Danish short story writers